Mama, I'm Alive is a 1977 East German film directed by Konrad Wolf. It was chosen as East Germany's official submission to the 50th Academy Awards for Best Foreign Language Film, but did not manage to receive a nomination. It was also entered into the 27th Berlin International Film Festival.

Cast
 Peter Prager as Günther Becker
 Uwe Zerbe as Walter Pankonin
 Eberhard Kirchberg as Karl Koralewski
 Detlef Gieß as Helmuth Kuschke
 Donatas Banionis as Mauris
 Margarita Terekhova as Svetlana
 Ivan Lapikov as  General
 Yevgeni Kindinov  as Victor Glunsky
 Bolot Bejshenaliyev  as Chingiz
 Mikhail Vaskov as Kolya
 Anatoli Papanov as home owner
 Anatoli Rudakov as Vasya
 Svetlana Kryuchkova as Military headquarters in Chingiz

See also
 List of submissions to the 50th Academy Awards for Best Foreign Language Film
 List of German submissions for the Academy Award for Best Foreign Language Film

References

External links

1977 films
East German films
Soviet war drama films
1970s German-language films
Films directed by Konrad Wolf
1970s war drama films
War romance films
1977 romantic drama films
German romantic drama films
German war drama films
1970s German films